Gomorrah is an Italian crime drama television series created and produced by Roberto Saviano, based on Saviano's book of the same name. It originally aired on the Sky Italia network on 6 May 2014, and ran for five seasons, ending on 17 December 2021. It premiered in the United Kingdom on Sky Atlantic on 4 August 2014, and in the United States on SundanceTV on 24 August 2016. The series has also been sold in 190 countries worldwide.

The show tells the story of Ciro Di Marzio (Marco D'Amore), a member of the Savastano clan, headed by Pietro Savastano (Fortunato Cerlino), a high-ranking member. Ciro aims to navigate the dangers of the criminal world, while also fighting a brutal civil war. The title is a play on the Neapolitan crime syndicate Camorra, and the show is set and filmed in Naples. The Savastano family also consists of his wife Immacolata (Maria Pia Calzone) and son, Gennaro (Salvatore Esposito). The show also features rival crime boss Salvatore Conte (Marco Palvetti), while introducing the characters Annalisa Magliocca (Cristina Donadio), Patrizia Santore (Cristiana Dell'Anna), Giuseppe Avitabile (Gianfranco Gallo), Enzo "Sangueblù" Villa (Arturo Muselli), Gerlando Levante (Gianni Parisi), Michelangelo "Mickey" Levante (Luciano Giugliano) and Federico Maccauro (Carmine Paternoster) in the show's later seasons.

Series overview

Episodes

Season 1 (2014)

Season 2 (2016)

Season 3 (2017)

Season 4 (2019)

Season 5 (2021)

Notes

References

Lists of Italian television series episodes
Lists of crime drama television series episodes